Salvia hirtella is a species of flowering plant in the sage/mint family Lamiaceae, native to the Ecuadorian province of Cotopaxi, found both north and south of the equator. Its native habitat is limited to higher altitudes in the Andes mountains, with most plants collected around  elevation.

The calyx and the inflorescence stem are covered in dark purple hairs with glands, justifying its specific epithet hirtella (hairy), with the calyces remaining long after blooming.

Notes

hirtella
Flora of Ecuador
Taxa named by Martin Vahl